Visco is a comune (municipality) in the Province of Udine in the Italian region Friuli-Venezia Giulia, located about  northwest of Trieste and about  southeast of Udine.

Visco borders the following municipalities: Aiello del Friuli, Bagnaria Arsa, Palmanova, San Vito al Torre.

Notable people
Ferruccio Tassin (historic, writer, cultural operator);
Giordano Pazzut (holy music composer );
Rodolfo Del Mestri (painter);
Pierre Bosco (painter);
Giovanni Minut (poet);
Eduard Michael Avian (born in Visco 6 August 1877; construction company in Klagenfurt; died: 30 October 1910);

Demographic evolution

References

External links
 www.comune.visco.ud.it

Cities and towns in Friuli-Venezia Giulia